Birkdale is a district to the south of Southport, Sefton, Merseyside, England.  It contains 20 buildings that are recorded in the National Heritage List for England as designated listed buildings.   Of these, one is listed at  Grade II*, the middle of the three grades, and the others are at Grade II, the lowest grade.

Southport did not develop as a town and seaside resort until the late 18th century.  As it grew and became more prosperous, it expanded to the south to form the district of Birkdale.  Much of the layout of the district was planned, although the plans were not always followed strictly.  All but three of its listed buildings date from between the middle of the 19th century and the early years of the 20th century.  Two buildings pre-date this development, one of them being a surviving cob house with a cruck frame.  The newest listed building, the Modernist Round House, was designed by a local cabinet maker.  Most of the other listed buildings originated as large houses, five are churches (two with presbyteries), and one is a school.

Key

Buildings

References

Citations

Sources

Listed buildings in Merseyside
Lists of listed buildings in Merseyside